Labrys neptuniae is a bacterium from the family Xanthobacteraceae which has been isolated from the root nodules from the plant Neptunia oleracea in Taiwan.

References

Further reading

External links
Type strain of Labrys neptuniae at BacDive -  the Bacterial Diversity Metadatabase

Hyphomicrobiales
Bacteria described in 2007